is a railway station located in Nakama, Fukuoka in Japan.

Lines 
Chikuhō Electric Railroad
Chikuhō Electric Railroad Line

Platforms

Adjacent stations

Surrounding area
 7-Eleven
 Umeyasutenmangu Shrine
 Nakamatokuwaka Post Office
'Nakamahigashi Kindergarten

References

Railway stations in Fukuoka Prefecture
Railway stations in Japan opened in 1956